John Brann (20 January 1892 – 28 June 1945) was a South African cricketer. He played in twelve first-class matches for Eastern Province from 1910/11 to 1921/22.

See also
 List of Eastern Province representative cricketers

References

External links
 

1892 births
1945 deaths
South African cricketers
Eastern Province cricketers
Cricketers from Port Elizabeth